Peter Wallace is commonly held to have been an English or Scottish buccaneer who, in 1638 aboard the Swallow, founded the first English settlement in present-day Belize. Wallace's historicity is debated, first emerging in the 1829 Honduras Almanack,  however several scholars deem him a legendary protagonist of the country's founding myth, rather than an actual historical figure.

Buccaneering

In 1638, Wallace is believed to have landed at Swallow Caye aboard the Swallow, with a crew of some 80 British men. This is often regarded as the first non-Mayan, non-Hispanic settlement in present-day Belize.

Legacy

Social
Wallace became the subject of local buccaneering myths and legends by at least the 1830s, emerging from the 1829 Honduras Almanack. Swallow Caye is believed to be named after the Swallow. Similarly, the 'Belize' toponym is commonly held to be a Spanish-mediated corruption of 'Wallace' or 'Wallis.'

Scholarly

19th century 
The earliest mention of Wallace in print is thought to be that of the Honduras Almanack for 1829, which noted that 'Wallice' was a 'Lieutenant among the Bucaniers who formerly infested these seas [the Bay of Honduras] ... [and who] first discovered the mouth of the River Belize.' The same publication gave further notice of Wallace in 1839, now noting – 

This information was promptly popularised by John Lloyd Stephens, who, on 30 October 1839, landed in Belize with Frederick Catherwood en route to Mayan ruins in Guatemala, further enriched by Justo Sierra O'Reilly on 5 September 1849, and repeated throughout scholarly and lay literature of the 19th century. By 1883, an historian described the state of affairs thus –

20th century 
A number of competing theories regarding Wallace's identity and arrival to Belize were proffered in the 20th century.
 In 1925, Guatemalan historian Francisco Arturias claimed that Wallace was Sir Walter Raleigh's chief mate at least during that privateer's El Dorado expedition, and further, that Wallace sailed from England on 14 May 1603, settled Belize shortly thereafter, but abandoned the settlement in 1617, finally dying in England in 1621. Notably, this theory was accepted by Sir Alan Burdon in 1931.
 In 1946, Belizean historian E. O. Winzerling claimed that 'Willis' set sail for Tortuga in 1639 with a group of men 'drawn mostly from those expelled from Nevis' and became their governor there, and further, that Wallace and company were routed from Tortuga by the French in August 1640 and arrived at the mouth of the Belize River, founding a settlement there 'approximately in September 1640.'
 In 1956, American geographer James Jerome Parsons suggested that Wallace may have been an Old Providence Puritan who, with a sizeable contingent of refugee settlers, arrived in Belize in 1641 after the Spanish capture of Old Providence.

21st century 
Recent, 21st century literature has tended towards agnosticism regarding the identity and historicity of Wallace. However, some scholars have deemed this trend 'incorrect,' arguing that Wallace is demonstrably apocryphal. Most notably, historians Barbara and Victor Bulmer-Thomas argued in 2016 that the Baymen George Westby and Thomas Pickstock, and the Jamaican historian George Wilson Bridges, disseminated the account of Wallace's founding of Belize in the 1820s, despite lacking primary sources. They further note, 'an extensive search for a buccaneer called 'Wallace,' 'Wallice' or 'Willis' in the 17th century reveals not surprisingly that there was no such person.'

Notes and references

Explanatory footnotes

Short citations

Full citations  

 
 
 
 
 
 
 
 
 
 
 
 
 
 
 
 
 
 
 
 
 
 
 
 
 
 
 
 
 
 
 
 
 
 
 
 
 
 
 
 
 
 
 
 
 
 
 
 
 

 
 
17th century in Belize
17th-century pirates
Caribbean pirates
English pirates